Simeon Peak rises to 1,580 m in Friesland Ridge, Tangra Mountains, Livingston Island in the South Shetland Islands, Antarctica.  The peak is heavily glaciated, connected to St. Boris Peak to the northeast by Paril Saddle, and surmounts Huntress Glacier to the northwest, Ruen Icefall to the southwest, and Macy Glacier to the east. It was first ascended and GPS-surveyed by the Bulgarian climbers D. Boyanov, N. Petkov and N. Hazarbasanov from Nesebar Gap via the head of Huntress Glacier, Academia Peak, St. Boris Peak and Paril Saddle on 15 January 2017.

The peak is named after Czar Simeon the Great of Bulgaria, 893-927 AD.

Location
British mapping in 1968, Argentine in 1980, Spanish in 1991, and Bulgarian in 2005 and 2009 from topographic surveys in 1995/96 (estimated elevation 1576 m) and 2004/05.

Maps
 Chart of South Shetland including Coronation Island, &c. from the exploration of the sloop Dove in the years 1821 and 1822 by George Powell Commander of the same. Scale ca. 1:200000. London: Laurie, 1822
 South Shetland Islands. Scale 1:200000 topographic map. DOS 610 Sheet W 62 60. Tolworth, UK, 1968.
 Islas Livingston y Decepción.  Mapa topográfico a escala 1:100000.  Madrid: Servicio Geográfico del Ejército, 1991.
 S. Soccol, D. Gildea and J. Bath. Livingston Island, Antarctica. Scale 1:100000 satellite map. The Omega Foundation, USA, 2004.
 L.L. Ivanov et al., Antarctica: Livingston Island and Greenwich Island, South Shetland Islands (from English Strait to Morton Strait, with illustrations and ice-cover distribution), 1:100000 scale topographic map, Antarctic Place-names Commission of Bulgaria, Sofia, 2005
 L.L. Ivanov. Antarctica: Livingston Island and Greenwich, Robert, Snow and Smith Islands. Scale 1:120000 topographic map. Troyan: Manfred Wörner Foundation, 2010.  (First edition 2009. )
 Antarctic Digital Database (ADD). Scale 1:250000 topographic map of Antarctica. Scientific Committee on Antarctic Research (SCAR). Since 1993, regularly upgraded and updated.
 L.L. Ivanov. Antarctica: Livingston Island and Smith Island. Scale 1:100000 topographic map. Manfred Wörner Foundation, 2017.

Gallery

Notes

References
 Simeon Peak. SCAR Composite Antarctic Gazetteer.
 Bulgarian Antarctic Gazetteer. Antarctic Place-names Commission. (details in Bulgarian, basic data in English)

External links
 Simeon Peak. Copernix satellite image

Tangra Mountains